Elizabeth Chesley Baity (March 5, 1907 – October 7, 1989) was an American academic and children's author. Her book Americans Before Columbus was a Newbery Honor recipient in 1952.

Biography

Elizabeth Chesley was born in Hamilton, Texas, where she grew up and attended school. She attended Texas University for Women. In 1930, she married Herman Baity.

Baity taught at the University of North Carolina. She was a noted researcher and author in the field of archaeoastronomy.

Americans Before Columbus, an overview of the subject for children, was published in 1951, and was named a Newbery Honor book the following year. A further volume, America Before Man, came out in 1953, and appeared on the "Best Books of the Year" list produced by The Horn Book Magazine.

Baity died in 1989, at the age of 82.

References

1907 births
1989 deaths
American children's writers
Newbery Honor winners
American women children's writers
20th-century American women
People from Hamilton, Texas